Julie Ditty Qualls (January 4, 1979 – August 31, 2021) was an American professional tennis player.

She had her WTA Tour breakthrough when she reached the semifinals of the Bell Challenge. It took her into the top 100 for the first time in her career, on November 5, 2007, at No. 91. She beat Alizé Cornet and Vania King before falling to Julia Vakulenko in three sets. In 2007, she was drafted by the Boston Lobsters of the WTT pro league.

Career

2008
In 2008, Ditty qualified for the Open Gaz de France tournament in Paris where she lost to the No. 6 seed and former world No. 1, Amélie Mauresmo. During the Proximus Diamond Games in Antwerp, she made it through the first round by defeating Alona Bondarenko, who was seeded eighth, and got to the second round there before falling to qualifier Timea Bacsinszky 5–7, 4–6, after having leads in both sets. Her win over world No. 22, Alona Bondarenko, was best-ever career win. In August, Julie defeated Yuan Meng in the first round at Cincinnati, marking her first win in a WTA Tour main-draw since Antwerp.

2009
Ditty was named to the United States Fed Cup team for their match in February against Argentina, after Bethanie Mattek withdrew with an injury; she played doubles with Liezel Huber. They would win the decisive match for the U.S. team, 6–2, 6–3.

Following Fed Cup, Julie lost in the opening round in Midland and in Memphis. She did not play in March.

In April, she won her opening main-draw match in Charleston, South Carolina, defeating Ayumi Morita 6–1, 6–1. This would mark her first tour-level win for the year. In her next tournament, a $75k at Dothan, Alabama, Julie retired in her opening round against Yan Zi. In doubles, she partnered with Carly Gullickson to extend her record of USTA ITF titles to 35 as they would win the doubles title.

In May, she entered the singles qualifying draws in Rome, Madrid, Strasbourg, and the French Open, failing to qualify in all four. In Rome, she partnered with Jill Craybas to win their opening round before falling in the second.

2010
Ditty appeared in the Family Circle Cup, Sony Ericsson Open, and in Wimbledon. She won her first qualifying match against Margalita Chakhnashvili, 6–4, 6–3. She then went on to defeat Jelena Dokić, 5–7, 7–5, 6–2 to reach the final round of qualifying where she lost a place in the main draw to compatriot Bethanie Mattek-Sands.

2014
In June 2014, Ditty emerged from retirement and led Team Kentucky to a decisive win in the Southern Senior Cup Women's 35 and over division. She followed this up by winning the US Open National Playoff tournament for the Southern section.

Death 
Julie Ditty died on August 31, 2021, at the age of 42 after battling breast cancer.

ITF Circuit finals

Singles: 14 (9 titles, 5 runners-up)

Doubles: 52 (30 titles, 22 runners-up)

References

 Julie Ditty Death

External links
 
 

1979 births
2021 deaths
American female tennis players
Sportspeople from Ashland, Kentucky
Tennis players from Atlanta
Tennis people from Kentucky
Vanderbilt Commodores women's tennis players
Deaths from cancer in Kentucky
Deaths from breast cancer